Forbury Hill may refer to:

 A hill in St Clair, New Zealand, a suburb of the city of New Zealand
 A formerly fortified mound in Forbury Gardens, in central Reading, England